Türker İnanoğlu (born May 18, 1936) is a Turkish screenwriter, film director and producer.

Life
He married first the film actress Filiz Akın, and after his divorce Gülşen Bubikoğlu, another former Turkish movie star. He has two children, a son, İlker, from his former marriage and a daughter, Zeynep, from his last marriage.

Career
İnanoğlu came in contact with the cinema when he was a student at the Istanbul Academy of Applied Fine Arts in 1957. After working as assistant to directors Ömer Lütfi Akat and Nişan Hançer in eleven movies, he directed in 1960 his first feature Senden Ayrı Yaşayamam.

After directing nine movies in the studios of Yeşilçam, the Turkish Hollywood, İnanoğlu established in 1959 his own film company Erler Film, which is today the oldest film production company in Turkey still in business. Since then, he produced 126 black-and-white and color films, among them 21 co-productions with Greece, Italy and Iran. He executed also the productions of American, Japanese, French and German filmmakers’ documentary films shot in Turkey. Until now, he directed 82 movies.

In 1979, İnanoğlu started the video business in Turkey by founding the first video company, Ulusal Video. His company distributed video copies of domestic movies to around 1,500 video clubs in Turkey and abroad. He contributed so five years long to the survival of Turkish cinema, which found itself in a big economic crisis.

To produce news and entertainment programs for the television, he established a studio in 1985. In this studio, İnanoğlu produced very popular programs like Bir Başka Gece ("Another night"), Hodri Meydan ("Challenge"), Gecenin getirdikleri ("Things came by night") for the then only TV channel in Turkey, TRT. Later, following the opening of private TV channels, he continued to produce TV programs for channels like Star TV, Show TV, Kanal 6 and ATV, totaling to 10,000 hours.

In 1994, İnanoğlu became president of the channel ATV and helped it became a leader in the sector. Recently, he established a cable TV channel, Süper Kanal

He co-founded sectoral associations and served as their chairman. Recently, he is the honorary president of the Turkish Association of Owners of Cinema Arts, SESAM. In 1997, he set up the Türker İnanoğlu Cinema Foundation and transferred all the copyrights on his productions to this charity institution with social and educational goals for the Turkish cinema.

Selected filmography

Screenwriter 
 İçimizden Biri (Someone from Us), 1960
 Şafakta Buluşalım (Let’s meet at dawn), 1961

Director 
 Sonbahar (The Autumn), 1959
 Senden Ayrı Yaşayamam (I Can’t Live Apart From You), 1960
 Küçük Kahraman (The Little Brave), 1960
 İçimizden Biri (Someone from Us), 1960
 Küçük Beyefendi (Little Gentleman), 1962
 Kiralık Koca (Husband for rent), 1963
 Bulunmaz Uşak (The Perfect Servant), 1963
 Bahriyeli Ahmet (Ahmet, the Mariner), 1963
 Yankesici Kız (The Pitpocket Girl), 1964
 Mirasyedi (The Heir)
 Satılık Kalp (Heart for sale), 1965
 Acı Tesadüf (Bitter Coincidence), 1966
 İdam Mahkumu (The Prisoner for Death Penalty), 1966
 Kaderin Cilvesi (Twist of Fate), 1967
 Namus Borcu (Honor Due), 1967
 Evlat Uğruna (For the Sake of Children), 1967
 İstanbul Tatili (Holiday in Istanbul), 1968
 Sabah Yıldızı (The Morning Star), 1968
 Soyguncular (The Robbers), 1973
 Bizim Kız (Our Girl), 1977

Producer 
 İçimizden Biri (Someone from Us), 1960
 Çöpçatan (The Matchmaker), 1961
 Küçük Beyefendi (Little Gentleman), 1962
 Yolcu (The Passenger), 1963
 Bulunmaz Uşak (The Perfect Servant), 1963
 Bahriyeli Ahmet (Ahmet, the Mariner), 1963
 Yankesici Kız (The Pitpocket Girl), 1964
 Satılık Kalp (Heart for sale), 1965
 İdam Mahkumu (The Prisoner for Death Penalty), 1966
 Acı Tesadüf (Bitter Coincidence), 1966
 İntikam Uğruna (For the Sake of Revenge), 1966
 Namus Borcu (Honor Due), 1967
 Evlat Uğruna (For the Sake of Children), 1967
 İstanbul Tatili (Holiday in Istanbul), 1968
 Almanyalı Yarim (My Darling From Germany), 1974
 Bizim Kız (Our Girl), 1977
 Süpermenler (3 Supermen Against Godfather in Europe, Tres supermanes contra el padrino in Spain), 1979
 Beyaz Ölüm (White Death), 1983
 Tele Kızlar (Call Girls), 1985
 Selamsız Bandosu (Selamsız’s Band), 1987 (co-production)
 Kaçamak (The Love Affair), 1988

TV series producer 
 Tatlı Kaçıklar (Sweet Nutcases), 1996
 İkinci Bahar (Second Spring), 1999
 Bizim Otel (Our Hotel), 2001
 Hastayım Doktor (I am Sick, Doctor), 2002
 Yabancı Damat (The Foreign Groom), 2004
 Anne Babamla Evlensene (Mommy, Marry My Daddy), 2005

References 
 
 Biography in Turkish

1936 births
Living people
Turkish male screenwriters
Turkish film directors
Turkish film producers
Golden Orange Life Achievement Award winners
Golden Butterfly Award winners
People from Safranbolu